The Rama III Bridge, also known as the New Krungthep Bridge, is a bridge crossing the Chao Phraya River in Bangkok, Thailand. The bridge was completed in 1999 and was designed to alleviate traffic congestion on the adjacent Krungthep Bridge. The bridge was named in honour of King Nangklao.

References

Road bridges in Bangkok
Bridges completed in 1999
Cantilever bridges
Crossings of the Chao Phraya River
1999 establishments in Thailand